The title of Earl of Cornwall was created several times in the Peerage of England before 1337, when it was superseded by the title Duke of Cornwall, which became attached to heirs-apparent to the throne.

Condor of Cornwall
Condor of Cornwall, probably legendary Earl of Cornwall before the Conquest, said to have paid homage to William for the Earldom

Earls of Cornwall, 1st creation (1068)
Brian of Brittany (c. 1040–1084 or 85), resigned c. 1072

Earls of Cornwall, 2nd creation (c. 1072)
Robert, Count of Mortain (c. 1038–1095), half-brother of William the Conqueror
William, Count of Mortain (1084–1140), peerage forfeit 1106

Cadoc II of Cornwall (c. 1106)
Cadoc II (or Candor), son of Cadoc of Cornwall

Earls of Cornwall, 1st creation (revived 1140)
Alan (died 1146), nephew of Brian, deprived 1141

Earls of Cornwall, 3rd creation (1141)
 Reginald de Dunstanville, Earl of Cornwall (died 1175), illegitimate son of King Henry I of England

Earls of Cornwall, 4th creation (1225)
Richard, 1st Earl of Cornwall, King of the Romans (1209–1272), second son of John, King of England
Edmund, 2nd Earl of Cornwall (1249–1300), son

Earls of Cornwall, 5th creation (1307)
Piers Gaveston, Earl of Cornwall (1284–1312)

Earls of Cornwall, 6th creation (1330)
John of Eltham, Earl of Cornwall (1316–1336), second son of king Edward II of England and his queen Isabella of France

See also

Constitutional status of Cornwall
Antiqua maneria, the original 17 manors belonging to the Earldom of Cornwall
Duchy of Cornwall
Kingdom of Cornwall
List of legendary rulers of Cornwall

References

Extinct earldoms in the Peerage of England
Medieval Cornwall
 
Earl
Forfeited earldoms in the Peerage of England
Noble titles created in 1067
Noble titles created in 1141
Noble titles created in 1225
Noble titles created in 1307
Noble titles created in 1330